Li Zhongyi (born 21 March 1963) is a Chinese former backstroke and medley swimmer who competed in the 1984 Summer Olympics.

References

1963 births
Living people
Chinese male medley swimmers
Chinese male backstroke swimmers
Olympic swimmers of China
Swimmers at the 1984 Summer Olympics
Asian Games medalists in swimming
Swimmers at the 1982 Asian Games
Asian Games gold medalists for China
Asian Games silver medalists for China
Medalists at the 1982 Asian Games
20th-century Chinese people